This is a list of female poets with a Wikipedia page, listed by the period in which they were born.

Before CE

1–500 CE

500–999 CE

11th–14th centuries
In chronological order:

15th century

16th century

17th century

18th century

19th-century (date of birth unknown)

Cornelia Laws St. John (died February 24, 1902), American poet and biographer

1800s

1810s

1820s

1830s

1840s

1850s

1860s

1870s

1880s

1890s

1900s

In alphabetical order:

1910s

In alphabetical order:

1920s

In alphabetical order:

1930s

In alphabetical order:

1940s

In alphabetical order:

1950s

In alphabetical order:

1960s
In alphabetical order:

1970s
In alphabetical order:

1980s
In alphabetical order:

1990s
In alphabetical order:

Current (date of birth unknown)
Elizabeth Acevedo, Dominican-American poet
Sandra Agard, British storyteller, poet and cultural historian
Star Black, American poet, photographer and artist
Hannah Drake, African-American poet
Beda Higgins, Anglo-Irish poet and writer
Kara Jackson, American poet and former National Youth Poet Laureate of the USA
Monica Ong, Asian-American visual poet

See also
Poetry
Poet
List of feminist poets

References

Lists of poets
 
Poets